Afrocneros excellens is a species of tephritid or fruit flies in the genus Afrocneros of the family Tephritidae.

References

Phytalmiinae